Creighton Williams Abrams Jr. (September 15, 1914 – September 4, 1974) was a United States Army general who commanded military operations in the Vietnam War from 1968 to 1972, which saw United States troop strength in South Vietnam reduced from a peak of 543,000 to 49,000. He was then Chief of Staff of the United States Army from 1972 until his death in 1974.

In 1980, the United States Army named its then new main battle tank, the M1 Abrams, after him. The IG Farben building in Germany was also named after Abrams from 1975 to 1995.

Military career

Early career
Abrams graduated from the United States Military Academy at West Point in the Class of 1936 (ranked 185th of 276 in the class), and served with the 1st Cavalry Division from 1936 to 1940, being promoted to first lieutenant in 1939 and temporary captain in 1940.

Abrams became an armor officer early in the development of that branch and served as a tank company commander in the 1st Armored Division in 1940.

World War II
During World War II, Abrams served in the 4th Armored Division, initially as regimental adjutant (June 1941 – June 1942), battalion commander (July 1942 – March 1943), and regiment executive officer (March–September 1943) with the 37th Armor Regiment. In September 1943, a reorganization of the division redesignated the 37th Armor Regiment to the 37th Tank Battalion, which Abrams commanded; he also commanded Combat Command B of the division during the Battle of the Bulge.

During this time Abrams was promoted to the temporary ranks of major (February 1942), lieutenant colonel (September 1942), and colonel (April 1945). Abrams was promoted to lieutenant colonel eleven days before his 28th birthday.

During much of this time, the 4th Armored Division (led by the 37th Tank Battalion) was the spearhead for General George S. Patton's Third Army, and Abrams was consequently well known as an aggressive armor commander. By using his qualities as a leader and by consistently exploiting the relatively small advantages of speed and reliability of his vehicles, he managed to defeat German forces that had the advantage of superior armor and superior guns. He was twice decorated with the Distinguished Service Cross for extraordinary heroism, on September 20 and December 26, 1944. General George Patton said of him: "I'm supposed to be the best tank commander in the Army, but I have one peer—Abe Abrams. He's the world champion." Frequently the spearhead of the Third Army during World War II, Abrams was one of the leaders in the relief effort that broke up the German entrenchments surrounding Bastogne and the 101st Airborne Division during the Battle of the Bulge. In April 1945, he was promoted to (temporary) colonel but reverted to lieutenant colonel during the post-war demobilization. On April 23, 1945, Will Lang Jr. wrote a biography of Abrams called "Colonel Abe" for Life.

Interbellum and Korean War
Following the war, Abrams served on the Army General Staff (1945–46), as head of the department of tactics at the Armored School, Fort Knox (1946–48), and graduated from the Command and General Staff College at Fort Leavenworth (1949).

Abrams commanded the 63rd Tank Battalion, part of the 1st Infantry Division, in Europe (1949–51). He was again promoted to colonel and commanded the 2nd Armored Cavalry Regiment (1951–52). These units were important assignments due to the Cold War concern for potential invasion of western Europe by the Soviet Union. He then attended and graduated from the Army War College in 1953.

Due to Abrams' service in Europe and his War College tour, he joined the Korean War late in the conflict. He successively served as chief of staff of the I, X and IX Corps in South Korea (1953–1954).

Staff assignments and division command
Upon Abrams' return from Korea, he served as Chief of Staff of the Armor Center, Fort Knox (1954–56). He was promoted to brigadier general and appointed deputy chief of staff for reserve components at the Pentagon (1956–59). He was assistant division commander of 3rd Armored Division (1959–60) and then commanded the division (1960–62) upon his promotion to major general. He was transferred to the Pentagon as deputy Chief of Staff for Operations (1962–63) and during this time he served as representative of the Army Chief of Staff overseeing the armed forces deployed to support the enrollment of James Meredith at the segregated University of Mississippi. He performed a similar role in May 1963 during the civil rights protests in Birmingham, Alabama. Following these roles Abrams demanded a more coherent policy for the swift employment of Federal forces domestically and on 25 May 1963, the Joint Chiefs formalized those arrangements with the Strike Command instructed to be prepared "to move ready, deployable, tailored Army forces ranging in size from a reinforced company to a maximum force of 15,000 personnel".

He was promoted to lieutenant general and commanded V Corps in Europe (1963–1964).

Abrams was on the cover of Time magazine three times in ten years: 1961 (October 13), 1968 (April 19), and 1971 (February 15).

Vietnam War

Abrams was promoted to general in 1964 and appointed Vice Chief of Staff of the United States Army, but not before being seriously considered as a candidate for chief of staff. Due to concerns about the conduct of the Vietnam War, he was appointed as deputy to his West Point classmate, General William Westmoreland, commander of the Military Assistance Command, Vietnam (MACV), in May 1967.

Abrams succeeded Westmoreland as COMUSMACV on June 10, 1968, although his tenure of command was not marked by the public optimism of his predecessors, who were prone to press conferences and public statements.

It has been asserted by authors such as Lewis Sorley that in contrast to Westmoreland, Abrams implemented counterinsurgency tactics that focused on winning the hearts and minds of the Vietnamese rural population. A joint military-civilian organization named Civil Operations and Revolutionary Development Support under CIA official William Colby carried out the hearts and minds programs. According to a colonel cited in Men's Journal, there was more continuity than change in Vietnam after Abrams succeeded Westmoreland. Newsweek magazine at the time of Abrams' appointment observed that its sources within the Lyndon Johnson administration had spoken at length with Abrams in the past and had come away convinced that the general would make few changes. The magazine quoted an unidentified military analyst to the effect that, "All this talk of dropping search-and destroy operations in favor of clear-and-hold is just a lot of bull." Indeed none of the strategy papers produced by Abrams on assuming command of MACV indicated the need for any change in U.S. strategy and U.S. forces continued large-scale operations to engage People's Army of Vietnam (PAVN) main force units including the Battle of Hamburger Hill in May 1969.

From 1969, the Vietnam War increasingly became a conventional war between the military forces of South Vietnam and North Vietnam. Following the election of President Richard Nixon, Abrams began implementing the Nixon Administration's Vietnamization policy to decrease U.S. involvement in Vietnam. With this new goal, Abrams had decreased American troop strength from a peak of 543,000 in early 1969 to 49,000 in June 1972. The South Vietnamese forces with aerial support from the U.S. repelled the PAVN conventional Easter Offensive in 1972. The prolonged efforts and expense of the war had by then exhausted much of the American public and political support. Abrams disdained most of the politicians with whom he was forced to deal, in particular Robert McNamara and McGeorge Bundy, and had an even lower opinion of defense contractors, whom he accused of war profiteering.

Abrams was also in charge of the Cambodian Incursion in 1970. President Nixon seemed to hold Abrams in high regard, and often relied on his advice. In a tape-recorded conversation between Nixon and National Security Advisor Henry Kissinger on December 9, 1970, Nixon told Kissinger about Abrams' thoughts on intervention in Cambodia that: "If Abrams strongly recommends it we will do it." Troop levels in Vietnam eventually reached 25,000 in January 1973, at the time of the four power Paris Peace Accords. Although it occurred before he assumed total command, Abrams bore the brunt of fallout from the My Lai massacre in March 1968.

Nixon grew increasingly dissatisfied with Abrams' performance during Operation Lam Son 719 and had debated for some time whether to recall Abrams. On May 4, 1972 Nixon resolved to replace Abrams with his former deputy General Frederick Weyand, but the decision was not publicly announced until 20 June 1972.

Chief of Staff

Abrams was appointed Chief of Staff of the United States Army by Nixon in June 1972. However, he was not confirmed by the United States Senate until October, due to political repercussions involving accusations of unauthorized bombings of North Vietnam. It has also been reported that Congress had delayed the confirmation to question the administration's war in Cambodia. During this time, Abrams began the transition to the all-volunteer army, also known as Project VOLAR.

In January 1974, Abrams directed the formation of a Ranger battalion. The 1st Battalion (Ranger), 75th Infantry, was activated and parachuted into Fort Stewart, Georgia, on July 1; the 2nd Battalion (Ranger), 75th Infantry followed with activation on October 1. The 3rd Battalion, 75th Infantry (Ranger), and Headquarters and Headquarters Company, 75th Infantry (Ranger), received their colors a decade later on October 3, 1984, at Fort Benning, Georgia. The 75th Ranger Regiment was designated in February 1986. The modern Ranger battalions owe their existence to Abrams and his charter:

Abrams served as Chief of Staff until his death on September 4, 1974.

Personal life
Born in Springfield, Massachusetts, and raised in the Feeding Hills section of Agawam, he was the son of Nellie Louise (Randall) and Creighton Williams Abrams, a railroad worker. Abrams married Julia Berthe Harvey  in 1936. She founded the army group of Arlington Ladies and devoted time to humanitarian causes.

The Abramses had three sons and three daughters. All three sons became Army general officers: retired Brigadier General Creighton Williams Abrams III, General John Nelson Abrams, and General Robert Bruce Abrams. Daughters Noel Bradley, Jeanne Daley, and Elizabeth Doyle all married army officers.

Abrams converted to Catholicism during his time in Vietnam; he was raised as Methodist Protestant.

A heavy cigar smoker, Abrams died at age 59, eleven days before his 60th birthday at Walter Reed Army Medical Center in Washington, D.C., from complications of surgery to remove a cancerous lung. He is buried with his wife Julia in Arlington National Cemetery.

Awards and decorations
His awards and decorations include:

Foreign decorations and awards

Dates of rank

Notes

Citations

References

 Sorley, Lewis. Thunderbolt: General Creighton Abrams and the army of his time. New York: Simon and Schuster, 1992. 
 Sorely, Lewis. "A better war. The unexamined victories and final tragedy of America's last years in Vietnam". Orlando: Harcourt, 1999.

External links

 Creighton William Abrahams, Jr. at ArlingtonCemetery.net, an unofficial website 
 Interview with Lewis Sorley on Vietnam Chronicles: The Abrams Tapes 1968–1972 at the Pritzker Military Library
 Source of quotes
 HistoryNet – Nixon-Abrams clash

|-

|-

1914 births
1974 deaths
United States Army personnel of the Korean War
United States Army personnel of the Vietnam War
United States Army personnel of World War II
Burials at Arlington National Cemetery
Joint Chiefs of Staff
Military personnel from Massachusetts
People from Springfield, Massachusetts
Tank commanders
United States Army Chiefs of Staff
United States Army Command and General Staff College alumni
United States Army generals
United States Army Vice Chiefs of Staff
United States Military Academy alumni
United States Army War College alumni
Converts to Roman Catholicism from Methodism
Catholics from Massachusetts
Recipients of the Distinguished Service Cross (United States)
Recipients of the Defense Distinguished Service Medal
Recipients of the Distinguished Service Medal (US Army)
Recipients of the Air Force Distinguished Service Medal
Recipients of the Silver Star
Recipients of the Legion of Merit
Recipients of the Czechoslovak War Cross
Chevaliers of the Légion d'honneur
Commandeurs of the Légion d'honneur
Recipients of the Croix de Guerre 1939–1945 (France)
Grand Cordons of the Order of the Rising Sun
Recipients of the Order of Military Merit (Korea)
Order of National Security Merit members
Recipients of the National Order of Vietnam
Recipients of the Gallantry Cross (Vietnam)
Companions of the Distinguished Service Order